William Thomas Clark (June 29, 1831 – October 12, 1905) was an American soldier and politician, serving as a general in the Union army during the American Civil War and as a postbellum U.S. Congressman.

Birth and early years
Clark was born in Norwalk, Connecticut. He became a school teacher and moved in 1854 to New York City, where he passed the bar exam. After marrying, he moved to Iowa and established a legal practice.

Civil War
At the beginning of the Civil War, he became a lieutenant and adjutant of the 13th Iowa Infantry Regiment. He fought at the battle of Shiloh and Corinth. He served as assistant adjutant general in the XVII Corps during the siege of Vicksburg and assistant adjutant-general to the Army of the Tennessee during the Atlanta Campaign. He was made a brevet brigadier general for service in the Atlanta Campaign and was assigned to an infantry brigade in the XV Corps during the Carolinas Campaign, but was only lightly engaged in fighting. He rose to the full rank of brigadier general of volunteers (1865) and was made a brevet major general at the close of the same year for gallant and meritorious services during the war.

After the war, he made his home in Galveston, Texas, where he organized the first negro school and befriended negroes at the risk of his life. He founded the First National Bank and was its first cashier, and also served as postmaster. He was a Republican. As a representative from Texas in Congress in 1870–72, he obtained the first appropriation for the harbor of Galveston ($100,000), making possible the completion of the jetties there.

See also

List of American Civil War generals (Union)

References

Handbook of Texas Online

People from Galveston, Texas
Politicians from Norwalk, Connecticut
Union Army generals
1831 births
1905 deaths
Republican Party members of the United States House of Representatives from Texas
19th-century American politicians
Military personnel from Texas